The Conte di Cavour–class battleships were a group of three dreadnoughts built for the Royal Italian Navy (Regia Marina) in the 1910s. The ships were completed during World War I, but none saw action before the end of hostilities.  was sunk by a magazine explosion in 1916 and sold for scrap in 1923. They were extensively reconstructed between 1933 and 1937 with more powerful guns, additional armor and considerably more speed than before.

Both ships participated in the Battle of Calabria in July 1940, when Giulio Cesare was lightly damaged. They were both present when British torpedo bombers attacked the fleet at Taranto in November 1940, and Conte di Cavour was torpedoed. She was grounded with most of her hull underwater and her repairs were not completed before the Italian surrender in September 1943. Conte di Cavour was scrapped in 1946. Giulio Cesare escorted several convoys, and participated in the Battle of Cape Spartivento in late 1940 and the First Battle of Sirte in late 1941. She was designated as a training ship in early 1942, and escaped to Malta after Italy surrendered. The ship was transferred to the Soviet Union in 1949 and renamed Novorossiysk. The Soviets also used her for training until she was sunk when a mine exploded in 1955. She was scrapped in 1957.

Design and description

The Conte di Cavour–class ships were designed by Rear Admiral Engineer Edoardo Masdea, Chief Constructor of the Regia Marina, and were ordered in response to French plans to build the s. They were intended to be superior to the Courbets and to remedy 's perceived flaws of weak protection and armament. They were still given a  advantage over the  standard of most foreign dreadnoughts. Foreign dreadnoughts were being designed with  guns, but the Regia Marina was forced to use  guns in the Conte di Cavours because Italy lacked the ability to build larger guns. An additional gun, making a total of 13, was added to offset this deficiency.

Taking advantage of the lengthy building times of these ships, other countries were able to build dreadnoughts that were superior in protection and armament, with the exception of the French. Construction was delayed by late deliveries of the 305-millimeter guns and armor plates as well as shortages of labor. The Italo-Turkish War of 1911–1912 diverted workers at the shipyards for repairs and maintenance of the ships participating in the war. The Italians imported the raw nickel steel for their armor from America and Britain and processed it into their equivalent of Krupp cemented armor, called Terni cemented, but there were problems with this process and suitable plates took longer to produce than planned.

Basic characteristics
The Conte di Cavour class was provided with a complete double bottom and their hulls were subdivided by 23 longitudinal and transverse bulkheads. The ships had two rudders, both on the centerline. They had a crew of 31 officers and 969 enlisted men.

Propulsion
The original machinery for all three ships consisted of three Parsons steam turbine sets, arranged in three engine rooms. The center engine room housed one set of turbines that drove the two inner propeller shafts. It was flanked by compartments on either side, each housing one turbine set which powered the outer shafts. Steam for the turbines was provided by 20 Blechynden water-tube boilers in Conte di Cavour and Leonardo da Vinci, eight of which burned oil and twelve of which burned both oil and coal. Giulio Cesare used a dozen each oil-fired and mixed-firing Babcock & Wilcox boilers. They only achieved speeds ranging from  using . Each ship was equipped with three turbo generators that provided a total of 150 kilowatts at 110 volts.

Armament
As built, the ships' main armament comprised thirteen 46-caliber 305-millimeter guns, designed by Armstrong Whitworth and Vickers, in five gun turrets. The turrets were all on the centerline, with a twin-gun turret superfiring over a triple-gun turret in fore and aft pairs, and a third triple turret amidships, designated 'A', 'B', 'Q', 'X', and 'Y' from bow to stern. This was only one fewer gun than the Brazilian Rio de Janeiro, then the most heavily armed battleship in the world; Rio de Janeiros guns were mounted in seven twin-gun turrets. The turrets had an elevation capability of −5° to +20 degrees and the ships could carry 100 rounds for each gun, although 70 was the normal load. The turrets had hydraulic training and elevation, with an auxiliary electric system.

The secondary armament on the first two ships consisted of eighteen 50-caliber  guns, also designed by Armstrong Whitworth and Vickers, mounted in casemates on the sides of the hull. These guns could depress to −10 degrees and had a maximum elevation of +15 degrees; they had a rate of fire of six shots per minute. The ships carried a total of 3,600 rounds for them. For defense against torpedo boats, the ships carried fourteen 50-caliber  guns; thirteen of these could be mounted on the turret tops, but they could be mounted in 30 different positions, including some on the forecastle and upper decks. These guns had the same range of elevation as the secondary guns, and their rate of fire was higher at 10 rounds per minute. The ships were also fitted with three submerged  torpedo tubes, one on each broadside and the third in the stern.

Armor
It had a maximum thickness of  amidships, reducing to  towards the stern and  towards the bow. The lower edge of this belt was a uniform  in thickness. Above this strake was a thinner one, 130 millimeters thick, that extended  from the bow to 'X' turret. Fore and aft transverse bulkheads connected the armored belt to the decks.

The forward conning tower had walls 280 millimeters thick; those of the aft conning tower were 180 millimeters thick.

Modifications and reconstruction

Shortly after the end of World War I, the number of 50-caliber 76 mm guns was reduced to 13, all mounted on the turret tops, and six new 40-caliber 76-millimeter anti-aircraft (AA) guns were installed abreast the aft funnel. In addition two license-built 2-pounder AA guns were mounted on the forecastle deck abreast 'B' turret. In 1925–1926 the foremast was replaced by a tetrapodal mast, which was moved forward of the funnels, the rangefinders were upgraded, and the ships were equipped to handle a Macchi M.18 seaplane mounted on the center turret. Around that same time, one or both of the ships was equipped with a fixed aircraft catapult on the port side of the forecastle.

The sisters began an extensive reconstruction program directed by Vice Admiral (Generale del Genio navale) Francesco Rotundi in October 1933. This lasted until June 1937 for Conte di Cavour and October 1937 for Giulio Cesare, and resulted in several changes. The ships' crews increased to 1,260 officers and enlisted men.
Only 40% of the original ship's structure remained after the reconstruction was completed.

The center turret and the torpedo tubes were removed and all of the existing secondary armament and AA guns were replaced by a dozen 120-millimeter guns in six twin-gun turrets and eight  AA guns in twin turrets. In addition the ships were fitted with a dozen 54-caliber Breda  light AA guns in six twin-gun mounts and twelve  Breda M31 anti-aircraft machine guns, also in twin mounts. In 1940 the 13.2 mm machine guns were replaced by 65-caliber  AA guns in twin mounts. Giulio Cesare received two more twin mounts as well as four additional 37 mm guns in twin mounts on the forecastle between the two turrets in 1941.

The armor protecting the barbettes was reinforced with  plates.

The existing underwater protection was replaced by the Pugliese system that consisted of a large cylinder surrounded by fuel oil or water that was intended to absorb the blast of a torpedo warhead. It lacked enough depth to be fully effective against contemporary torpedoes. A major problem of the reconstruction was that the ships' increased draft meant that their waterline armor belt was almost completely submerged with any significant load.

Ships

Service

Conte di Cavour and Giulio Cesare served as flagships in the southern Adriatic Sea during World War I, but saw no action and spent little time at sea. Leonardo da Vinci was also little used and was sunk by an internal magazine explosion at Taranto harbor on the night of 2/3 August 1916 while loading ammunition. Casualties included 21 officers and 227 enlisted men killed. The Italians blamed Austro-Hungarian saboteurs, but unstable propellant may well have been responsible. The ship was refloated, upside down, on 17 September 1919 and righted on 24 January 1921. The Regia Marina planned to modernize her by replacing her center turret with six  AA guns, but lacked the funds to do so and sold her for scrap on 22 March 1923.

In 1919, Conte di Cavour sailed to North America and visited ports in the United States as well as Halifax, Canada. Giulio Cesare made port visits in the Levant in 1919 and 1920. Conte di Cavour was mostly inactive in 1921 because of personnel shortages and was refitted at La Spezia from November to March 1922. Both battleships supported Italian operations on Corfu in 1923 after an Italian general and his staff were murdered on the Greco-Albanian border; Benito Mussolini was not satisfied with the Greek Government's response so he ordered Italian troops to occupy the island. Conte di Cavour bombarded the town with her 76 mm guns, killing 20 and wounding 32 civilians.

Conte di Cavour escorted King Victor Emmanuel III and his wife aboard Dante Alighieri, on a state visit to Spain in 1924 and was placed in reserve upon her return until 1926, when she conveyed Mussolini on a voyage to Libya. The ship was again placed in reserve from 1927 until 1933. Her sister became a gunnery training ship in 1928, after having been in reserve since 1926. Conte di Cavour was reconstructed at the CRDA Trieste Yard while Giulio Cesare was rebuilt at Cantieri del Tirreno, Genoa between 1933 and 1937. Both ships participated in a naval review by Adolf Hitler in the Bay of Naples in May 1938 and covered the invasion of Albania in May 1939.

Early in World War II, the sisters took part in the Battle of Calabria (also known as the Battle of Punta Stilo) on 9 July 1940, as part of the 1st Battle Squadron, commanded by Admiral Inigo Campioni, during which they engaged major elements of the British Mediterranean Fleet. The British were escorting a convoy from Malta to Alexandria, while the Italians had finished escorting another from Naples to Benghazi, Libya. Admiral Andrew Cunningham, commander of the Mediterranean Fleet, attempted to interpose his ships between the Italians and their base at Taranto. Three minutes after she opened fire, shells from Giulio Cesare began to straddle Warspite which made a small turn and increased speed, to throw off the Italian ship's aim, at 16:00. Fragments started several fires and their smoke was drawn into the boiler rooms, forcing four boilers off-line as their operators could not breathe. Uncertain how severe the damage was, Campioni ordered his battleships to turn away in the face of superior British numbers and they successfully disengaged. Repairs to Giulio Cesare were completed by the end of August and both ships unsuccessfully attempted to intercept British convoys to Malta in August and September.

On the night of 11 November 1940, Conte di Cavour and Giulio Cesare were at anchor in Taranto harbor when they were attacked by 21 Fairey Swordfish torpedo bombers from the British aircraft carrier , along with several other warships. One torpedo exploded underneath 'B' turret at 23:15, and her captain requested tugboats to help ground the ship on a nearby  sandbank. His admiral vetoed the request until it was too late and Conte di Cavour had to use a deeper, sandbank at 04:30 on 12 November. In an effort to lighten the ship, her guns and parts of her superstructure were removed and Conte di Cavour was refloated on 9 June 1941. Temporary repairs to enable the ship to reach Trieste for permanent repairs took until 22 December. Her guns were operable by September 1942, but replacing her entire electrical system took longer and she was still under repair when Italy surrendered a year later. The Regia Marina made plans to replace her secondary and anti-aircraft weapons with a dozen  dual-purpose guns in twin mounts, twelve 64-caliber , and twenty-three 65-caliber 20 mm AA guns. Her hulk was damaged in an air raid and capsized on 23 February 1945. Refloated shortly after the end of the war, Conte di Cavour was scrapped in 1946.

Giulio Cesare participated in the Battle of Cape Spartivento on 27 November 1940, but never got close enough to any British ships to fire at them. The ship was damaged in January 1941 by a near miss during an air raid on Naples; repairs were completed in early February. She participated in the First Battle of Sirte on 17 December 1941, providing distant cover for a convoy bound for Libya, again never firing her main armament. In early 1942, Giulio Cesare was reduced to a training ship at Taranto and later Pola. She steamed to Malta in early September 1943 after the Italian surrender. The  unsuccessfully attacked the ship in the Gulf of Taranto in early March 1944.

After the war, Giulio Cesare was allocated to the Soviet Union as war reparations in 1949, and renamed Novorossiysk, after the Soviet city on the Black Sea. The Soviets used her as a training ship when she was not undergoing one of her eight refits in their hands. In 1953, all remaining Italian light AA guns were replaced by eighteen 37 mm 70-K AA guns in six twin mounts and six singles. They also replaced her fire-control systems and added radars, although the exact changes are unknown. The Soviets intended to rearm her with their own 305 mm guns, but this was forestalled by her loss. While at anchor in Sevastopol on the night of 28/29 October 1955, she detonated a large German mine left over from World War II. The explosion blew a hole completely through the ship, making a  hole in the forecastle forward of 'A' turret. The flooding could not be controlled and she later capsized with the loss of 608 men. Novorossiysk was stricken from the Navy List on 24 February 1956, salvaged on 4 May 1957, and subsequently scrapped.

Notes

Footnotes

References

Further reading

External links

 Cavour class – Plancia di Comando
 Conte di Cavour Marina Militare website

Battleship classes